Poromitra is a genus of ridgeheads. The 22 known species of Poromitra have been divided into five species groups according to variation in preopercle anatomy.

A Poromitra curilensis specimen from the Shirshov Institute of Oceanology, obtained on October 7, 1968, marks the first discovery of a Poromitra member in the southeastern Pacific Ocean.

Species
There are currently 21 recognized species in this genus:
 Poromitra atlantica (Norman, 1929)
 Poromitra capito Goode & T. H. Bean, 1883
 Poromitra coronata (Gilchrist & von Bonde, 1924)
 Poromitra crassa Parin & Ebeling, 1980
 Poromitra crassiceps (Günther, 1878) (Crested bigscale)
 Poromitra cristiceps (C. H. Gilbert, 1890)
 Poromitra curilensis Kotlyar, 2008
 Poromitra decipiens Kotlyar, 2008
 Poromitra frontosa (Garman, 1899)
 Poromitra gibbsi Parin & Borodulina, 1989
 Poromitra glochidiata Kotlyar, 2008
 Poromitra indooceanica Kotlyar, 2008
 Poromitra jucunda Kotlyar, 2010
 Poromitra kukuevi Kotlyar, 2008
 Poromitra macrophthalma (Gilchrist, 1903)
 Poromitra megalops (Lütken, 1878)
 Poromitra nigriceps (Zugmayer, 1911)
 Poromitra nigrofulva (Garman, 1899)
 Poromitra oscitans Ebeling, 1975 (Yawning)
 Poromitra rugosa (W. M. Chapman, 1939)
 Poromitra unicornis (C. H. Gilbert, 1905)

References

Melamphaidae
Ray-finned fish genera